Chronicles of the Raven is the first of two trilogies by James Barclay which revolves around a band of mercenaries named The Raven.

The trilogy consists of three novels, all set in the fantasy world of Balaia:
 Dawnthief
 Noonshade
 Nightchild

His trilogy Legends of the Raven continues on from the events of Nightchild after an interval of two seasons.

Summary

Dawnthief is the first in the trilogy and introduces the reader to the mercenary band known as The Raven, having been successfully together for about ten years. However, this all changes when they meet the Xeteskian Mage Denser. They learn of the approaching danger of the Wesmen and their shaman and set off on a quest to collect objects needed to perform the spell Dawnthief, which will effectively take away the shaman's powers. Along the way they are captured by the Black Wings, a radical group against all magic,  suffering some losses but also acquiring new members, including the Dordovan mage Erienne Malanvai, Will Begman (a thief), Jandyr (an elf) and Thraun (a shapechanger). The mercenary band travel to the ancient city of Parve in the West of Balaia and successfully cast the Dawnthief spell.

Noonshade is the second book in the trilogy, and starts half an hour (book time) after the end of Dawnthief. At the end of Dawnthief Denser had cast the Dawnthief spell to destroy the Wytch Lords, and just to make sure they don't come back he opened a dimensional rip leading to nowhere. But he had unknowingly opened it into Sha-kaan's (the golden dragon in the last book) dimension. The Raven have to close the dimensional rip hovering above Parve, which is growing. If they fail then the Khaan brood won't be able to hold the other, larger broods off.

The trilogy spans a long period of time due to a gap of 4 and a half years between Noonshade and Nightchild.

Characters
Hirad Coldheart: A barbarian warrior of unknown origin, Hirad is one of the original founders of the Raven. Erienne once described him as 'the heart of the raven' and Ilkar said that Hirad 'made the Raven live.' Although he is not the smartest member of the group his faith and unflinching loyalty to his friends are really their vital pulse. It is Hirad who reminds everyone that the members of the Raven never work away from each other and maintain their awesome strength precisely because they are always united.

The Unknown Warrior (Sol): Another founding member of the Raven. The Unknown owns a tavern with a friend named Tomas in Korina, the capital city of Balaia. The tavern, called The Rookery, is the only real headquarters of the Raven and gave the group its name. The Unknown's true identity is initially concealed but it later emerges that his true name is Sol and he comes from the city of Xetesk. His soul had been earmarked from birth to become one of the fabled Protectors, an elite force of masked soldiers whose souls are held in thrall by demons after death and forced to protect the magical college of Xetesk, and he had been trained from childhood to become a truly effective warrior. However, on discovering in his teens that he was destined for eternal servitude as a Protector, he ran away to Korina, where he met Tomas, and later formed The Raven.  He does eventually escape that destiny, earning the undying loyalty of his former Protector brothers in the process.  He has a wife named Diera, and a son, Jonas.

Ilkar: He is a Julatsan mage and another of the founders of the Raven. As an elf he is presumed to be very old, occasionally alluding to his great age in jokes at Hirad's expense. While providing vital mage support to the Raven, Ilkar is also often the voice of reason in the group. He feels his responsibility to his college very strongly, more so after the Wesmen invasion that nearly destroys it. He has a troubled relationship with his existing family, conflict stemming from the fact that he rejected his 'chosen' path as a protector of Aryndeneth (a site of great religious importance to the elves in their home on Calaius) and instead became a mercenary mage in Balaia. While you are never introduced to his parents, his brother Rebraal features in the second trilogy, Legends of the Raven. He has a relationship with the Julatsan mage Pheone during the period following the burying of the heart of Julatsa, but his true love is an elf from the Guild of Drech named Ren'erei.

Erienne Malanvai: She is a Dordovan lore mage and a later addition to the Raven group. Her life is streaked with terrible tragedies but she is nonetheless a truly strong woman. In many ways her character is really developed through grief. When she is first introduced she and her young twin sons have been kidnapped by Travers, the leader of the anti-mage Black Wings, and his lieutenant Selik. Although Erienne is eventually freed by the Raven (and notably not Dordover, her magical college) her sons and husband, Alun, are brutally murdered by the Black Wings. Though she believes she has exacted her revenge by helping The Raven defeat the Black Wings, and personally killing Selik with the spell IceWind, it is later revealed that he survived although terribly disfigured. Erienne is eventually persuaded to join the Raven despite her grief. She is elemental in helping them obtain one of the Dawnthief catalysts from Dordover thus breaking her association with the college that let her sons die and proving her faith in the Raven. She enters into a relationship with the Xeteskian mage Denser and it is not until later in the first trilogy that it's revealed that the child they conceive together harbours a new kind of magic known as the One. Erienne initially lay with Denser in order to produce a child of the One, but this soon develops into love and they later marry. Lyanna, their daughter, is the subject of the third book in the trilogy, Nightchild. In an attempt to protect her daughter from the four greedy colleges, all eager to control the power of the One magic, Erienne and Lyanna escape to an island known as Herendeneth, home to the last practitioners of the One magic, four ancient elves known as the Al Drechar. After a turbulent time Lyanna is finally killed despite the best efforts of the Raven and the power of the One magic is transferred to a devastated Erienne. When it becomes clear that the Al Drechar deliberately effected the transference at the cost of Lyanna's life because she couldn't contain the One entity, Erienne's fury is understandable; however, she now has the One magic whether she likes it or not and is eventually forced to allow the remaining Al Drechar help her shield her mind from the ravages of the One.

Synopsis of The Raven
The Raven are band of mercenaries, from the continent of Balaia, who  are famous, with a reputation for being the best at what they do. As a result, they already have all the money they need and so the fights and missions they choose to do during the books are what they choose to do and not what they are paid to do - this means that they do what they consider to be the just and right thing to do. The Raven have been together ten years before the beginning of DawnThief, and have already lost two members named Kirst and Halyn.

Each time a member of the Raven dies they observe their own private rituals, holding a Vigil and promising never to forget the dead member.

Philosophy of The Raven
The Raven are a very close knit group of friends. They share an utter belief that they will succeed in what they choose to do simply because they are The Raven.

Their code of conduct is such that they will never commit an act of murder, never take an action without consulting the rest of the group and will trust one another with their lives.

Nothing is more important to them then their group and whilst they will fight for country, plane and the greater good of their world; it is wholly because of their love for one another that they decide on which missions to undertake.  Even then the matter is discussed by The Raven as a whole before it is acted upon and all major decisions for the group are discussed openly amongst them.

They all devote themselves entirely to each other, such that should any one of them need help then the others will let nothing stand in their way to give it, even war or death.

Fantasy novel trilogies